Burrell High School is a public high school located at 1021 Puckety Church Road, Lower Burrell, Pennsylvania. Part of the Burrell School District, the building houses grades 9 through 12. According to the National Center for Education Statistics, in 2010, the school reported an enrollment of 627 pupils. Burrell High School employed 39 teachers, yielding a student–teacher ratio of 16:1.

Extracurricular activities
The district offers a wide variety of clubs, activities and sports.

Sports
The district provides:
Football: Varsity, Junior Varsity, Middle School
Boys Basketball: Varsity, 9th grade, Middle School
Girls Basketball: Varsity, Middle School
Boys Soccer
Girls Soccer
Boys Hockey: Varsity
Girls tennis varsity
Boys tennis varsity
Varsity Wrestling and Jr. High Wrestling
Swimming Varsity
Girls Volleyball
Golf *Track
Boys Cross Country
Girls Cross Country

Notable alumni
Jason Altmire, United States congressman

References

External links

Public high schools in Pennsylvania
Education in Pittsburgh